Puntapin Rock is a granite rock formation located approximately  south east of Wagin and approximately  west of Dumbleyung in the western Wheatbelt region of Western Australia. It is a prominent feature in the area, rising out of the surrounding flat plains.

It is found in the Yilgarn Block and composed of granite, a partially recrystallized archean adamellite that is mostly homogeneous. The rock does have some deformed lighter coloured veining throughout.

The population of Wagin were dependent on this dam for water supply until 1956 when the town was connected to Wellington Dam. Water from the Puntapin Dam is still mixed into the supply from Wellington.

The area now serves as a tourist attraction and public picnic area, and the Water Authority of Western Australia has allowed access to the rock's summit. The base of the rock has been equipped with picnic tables,
toilets, signage and walk trails.
 
The traditional owners of the area are the Noongar peoples. The granite dome, with its numerous gnamma holes, is a natural water catchment area used by the Noongar as well as the early sandalwood cutters and kangaroo hunters. The rock is part of a dreaming trail that extends from the south coast near Augusta to the Great Victoria Desert country to the north east. Other features along the trail include Mulka's Cave, Wave Rock, Jilakin Rock, Jitarning Rock and Dumbleyung Lake.

See also 
Granite outcrops of Western Australia

References 

Wheatbelt (Western Australia)
Rock formations of Western Australia
Dams in Western Australia
Places of Noongar significance